Monica Lindfors (born 22 November 2000) is a Finnish figure skater. With partner Juho Pirinen, she qualified to the final at the 2017 World Junior Championships.

Personal life 
Lindfors' older sister Viveca competed in single skating at the international level.

Programs 
(with Pirinen)

Competitive highlights
CS: Challenger Series

References

External links
 

Finnish female ice dancers
2000 births
Living people
Sportspeople from Helsinki
Dancers from Helsinki